Jordan Neel Taylor (born February 18, 1992) is a former American football wide receiver. He played college football at Rice University and signed as an undrafted free agent with the Denver Broncos in 2015. Taylor won Super Bowl 50 with the Broncos, beating the Carolina Panthers 24–10.

Professional career

Denver Broncos 
Taylor signed with the Broncos as an undrafted free agent on May 2, 2015. He spent his entire rookie season on the Broncos' practice squad where he was a personal receiver for Peyton Manning while Manning was rehabbing from a foot injury during the 2015 season.

On February 7, 2016, Taylor was part of the Broncos team that won Super Bowl 50. In the game, the Broncos defeated the Carolina Panthers by a score of 24–10.

In 2016, Taylor made the Broncos' 53-man roster and made his NFL debut in the season opener against the Carolina Panthers on September 8. He caught his first career NFL pass the following week against the Indianapolis Colts. On November 13, 2016, Taylor caught a 14-yard reception from Trevor Siemian for his first career touchdown during a 25–23 victory over the New Orleans Saints.

On September 1, 2018, Taylor was placed on the physically unable to perform list to start the season while recovering from hip surgery.

Minnesota Vikings 
On April 13, 2019, Taylor signed a one-year contract with the Minnesota Vikings. He was released on August 27, 2019.

References

External links
 Denver Broncos bio 
 Rice Owls bio 

1992 births
Living people
American football return specialists
American football wide receivers
Rice Owls football players
Denver Broncos players
Minnesota Vikings players
Players of American football from Texas
People from Denison, Texas